Irreplaceable You is a 2018 American romantic comedy-drama film written by Bess Wohl and directed  by Stephanie Laing. The film stars Gugu Mbatha-Raw and Michiel Huisman. It was released by Netflix on February 16, 2018.

Plot
Abbie and Sam have been best friends since childhood and are engaged to be married. Their lives come crashing down when Abbie is given a terminal cancer diagnosis.

Faced with the prospect of an uncertain timeline, Abbie begins a search for a new love to take care of Sam. Along the way, Abbie makes unlikely friendships with three patients whose one thing in common is that they focus on living while they are dying.

Abbie dies at the end without having lived up to her potential, yet manages to come to terms with her situation and with those she is leaving behind.

Cast
 Gugu Mbatha-Raw as Abbie
 Celeste O'Connor as Teen Abbie
 Alyssa Cheatham as Young Abbie
 Michiel Huisman as Sam
 Sawyer Barth as Teen Sam
 Zachary Hernandez as Young Sam
 Christopher Walken as Myron
 Brian Tyree Henry as Benji
 Steve Coogan as Mitch
 Timothy Simons as Dominic
 Tamara Tunie as Abbie's mother, Jane
 Jacki Weaver as Estelle
 Merritt Wever as Mindy
 Gayle Rankin as Mira
 Kate McKinnon as Glass Half Full Kate
 Jessie Ennis as Melanie
 Glenn Fleshler as Mean Phil

Reception
On Metacritic, the film has a weighted average score of 34 out of 100, based on 7 critics, indicating "generally unfavorable reviews".

References

External links 

Films about cancer
English-language Netflix original films
2018 films
Films about interracial romance
Films scored by Lesley Barber
2018 romantic comedy-drama films
American romantic comedy-drama films
2010s English-language films
2010s American films